The Orto Botanico "Pierina Scaramella" (2,200 m2), also known as the Orto Botanico dell'Università di Urbino, is a botanical garden maintained by the University of Urbino, and located at via Bramante, 28, Urbino, Marche, Italy. the entrance fee is 1 euro.

The garden was established in 1806 by Giovanni De Brignole. It was organized into: First terracing
The botanical garden covers 2200 square meters and is divided into three inclined terraces along the side of the hill where the city of Urbino stands. From this point you can admire the long and imposing three-ramp staircase leading to the main entrance of the garden and the greenhouse built in 1813 by De Brignoli and inside which all the plants that can not stand the winter cold and which only in summer they are located along the paths and flowerbeds in the garden.
All the space is used for the cultivation and study of medicinal plants (the simple ones) arranged in thirteen flower beds, with boxwood border, and grouped according to the properties and therefore the use that derives from them (plants active on the skin, digestive system, on the cardio-circulatory, nervous, genitourinary, respiratory system, plants with purgative, antiparasitic and insecticidal action. A poster design helps the visitor to find out about the historical and scientific origins of the simple gardens and their importance, on the use of plants. present in every single flower bed in the medicinal application area. During the visit of this shelf, the visitor will also be able to admire some very fascinating arboreal specimens located on the perimeter edges of the garden: Ginkgo biloba L., Picea excelsa Link. and Cedrus deodara G. Don fil.
Arboretum.

Second terrace From the simple garden, some steps, flanked by two small basins, lead to the second shelf. On the right side there is an old wrought iron pump, the work of the craftsman Quinto Galvani (1849). The whole area has been divided since its origins into long and narrow rectangular flowerbeds that delimit many small paths. The arrangement of herbaceous and shrubby species, made according to the Linnean system, was then modified according to the needs of cultivation and local climatic conditions. Along the paths you can also admire some tall trees: Tilia heterophylla Vent., Gleditschia triacanthos L., Calliandra houstoni Benth. The last adjacent flower beds
at the convent of S. Francesco, shady and damp, they host the ferns.

Third terrace Another four steps lead to the last shelf of the garden, this system structured like the second. Here we find species belonging to various families and a Taxus baccata L. and an imposing Fagus sylvatica L. which date back to the time of the foundation of the garden. This last shelf ends with the surrounding wall in which, in the summer, a part of the collection of is placed
fat plants.
Arboretum
To the right and behind the De Brignoli greenhouse, we find an area where you can admire several tall trees. Among these: the holm oak (Quercus ilex L.), The maple (Acer pseudo-platanus L.), The ailanthus (Ailanthus glandulosa Desf.), The cypress (Cupressus sempervirens L.) and the ash (Fraxinus excelsior L. Small irregular flowerbeds welcome some undergrowth species. A large greenhouse was built in 1811, and in 1812 the garden's first catalog listed 2731 species.

Today the garden contains medicinal and ornamental plants such as Ailanthus glandulosus, Sophora japonica, and Cycadaceae and Gymnospermae. Trees include Acer pseudo−platanus, Fagus silvatica, Fraxinus excelsior, Liriodendron tulipifera, Quercus ilex, and Taxus baccata.

See also 
 List of botanical gardens in Italy

References 
 Istituto Orto botanico "Pierina Scaramella
 Horti entry (Italian)
 Provincia di Pesaro e Urbino (Italian)
 BGCI entry

Botanical gardens in Italy
Urbino
Gardens in Marche
Buildings and structures in Urbino
Museums in Urbino